The 14th Division of the NKVD of the USSR for the Protection of railway facilities (Russian: 14-я дивизия войск НКВД СССР по охране железнодорожных сооружений) was a military formation of the USSR in the Great Patriotic War. It was a component of the NKVD Internal Troops.

It was formed in accordance with the order of the NKVD number 00922 of 3 August 1944.

From 1944 to 1946 it was placed under the Headquarters, Internal Troops, NKVD-MVD, Baltic Military District (Управление ВВ НКВД-МВД  Прибалтийского округа).

Alongside the division in the Baltic MD VV forces at times from 1944 were the 4th, 5th and 63rd Rifle Divisions NKVD, along with detachments from the Dzerzhensky Division from Moscow.

Dispositions 
 Division headquarters and units of combat support and logistics - Vilnius, Lithuanian SSR (1944–1951)
 76th Regiment - headquartered in the city of Orsha, Vitebsk Region, Byelorussian SSR (1950–1951)
 82nd Regiment - headquartered in the city of Insterburg (1945–1946), then in Königsberg former East Prussia (1946)
 152nd Regiment - headquartered in the city of Rēzekne (1944), then in Riga Latvian SSR (1944–1951)
 211th Regiment - headquartered in the city of Kaunas, Lithuanian SSR (1944–1951)
 212nd Regiment - headquartered in the city of Brest (1944–1945), then in Baranovichi, Brest Region, Byelorussian SSR (1945–1946,  1946–1951)
 213rd Regiment - first headquarters in the city of Bialystok, Belastok Region (1944–?), then in Molodechno, Minsk Region, Byelorussian SSR (?–1946)
 329th Regiment - headquartered in the city of Jelgava, Latvian SSR (1945)
 353rd Regiment - headquartered in the city of Kaunas, Lithuanian SSR (1946)

It served as part of the 'operational Army' from 3 August 1944 to 10 February 1945. It participated in the Operation Bagration, Baltic Offensive, East Prussian Offensive and East Pomeranian Offensive operations.

After the end of World War II the division conducted operational work to combat gang violence (the Forest Brothers).

It was disbanded in accordance with the order of the Ministry of Internal Affairs of the USSR number 00248 of 15 May 1951.

References

Divisions of the NKVD in World War II
Military units and formations established in 1944
Military units and formations disestablished in 1951